The Urariá Sustainable Development Reserve is a sustainable development reserve in the state of Amazonas, Brazil.

Location

The Urariá Sustainable Development Reserve in the municipality of Maués, Amazonas.
The reserve is on the left bank of the Paraná do Urariá in the northwest of the municipality of Maues.

The reserve has the capacity to support 750 families.
There are eleven scattered communities in the reserve.
The Grande da Barreira Lake area has seven communities, the Curuçá Lake area has two communities and there are two communities on the Paraná do Urariá.
Most of the residents are engaged in farming, fishing or extraction of forest resources.
They gain income from sale of cassava flour, fish, Brazil nuts and guaraná fruit, and raise cattle on a small scale.

History

The Urariá Sustainable Development Reserve was created by municipal decree 40 of 20 November 2001.
The main purpose was to manage the intense exploitation of fish stocks in the lake area, while relieving the poverty of the residents.
From the start, the reserve followed the principles of sustainable development, improvements to the quality of life of the residents and respect for the environment.
The municipality created the  Instituto de Desenvolvimento Sustentável de Maués (IDS Maués) to manage the reserve, and the Agroambiental Consultoria e Organização Projetos Ltda., a social organization with an office in Manaus.
The reserve would be included in the proposed South Amazon Ecological Corridor.

Notes

Sources

Sustainable development reserves of Brazil
Protected areas of Amazonas (Brazilian state)
2001 establishments in Brazil